Paul Harvey (1918–2009) was an American radio broadcaster. 

Paul Harvey may also refer to:
Paul Harvey Jr. (born 1948/49), son of Paul Harvey, also an American radio broadcaster
Paul H. Harvey (born 1947), British evolutionary biologist
Paul Harvey (actor) (1882–1955), American film actor
Paul Harvey (artist) (born 1960), British musician and artist
Paul Harvey (boxer) (born 1964), English boxer of the 1980s and '90s
Paul Harvey (darts player) (born 1966), British darts player
Paul Harvey (diplomat) (1869–1948), British diplomat and compiler of literary reference books
Paul Harvey (footballer) (born 1968), Scottish footballer
Paul Harvey (pianist) (born 1940), British pianist and composer